The 2017 Tour of Flanders was the 101st edition of the Tour of Flanders, a one-day cycling classic, that took place on 2 April 2017. It was the second monument race of the 2017 cycling season and the thirteenth event of the 2017 UCI World Tour. The race marked the pinnacle of the Flemish Cycling Week.

The race was won by Belgian national champion Philippe Gilbert from the  team, after a solo attack on the Oude Kwaremont and holding off the rest of the field over the remaining .

Route

The city of Antwerp staged the start of the event for the first time, after 19 starts in Bruges, marking the first time the Tour of Flanders addressed the province of Antwerp.

The first  of the race are on all-flat roads from Antwerp via Sint-Niklaas, Dendermonde, Aalst and Zottegem towards Oudenaarde, where the race passes for the first time after ; before addressing the first of 18 climbs, the Oude Kwaremont after . The Oude Kwaremont, which has been the focal point of the Ronde in the last few years, appears three times on the route and its last two appearances are paired with the Paterberg three kilometres later.

The final  were identical to previous editions. Of the final nine climbs, first was the Kanarieberg, then the first combination of Oude Kwaremont–Paterberg, followed just  later by the roughly-cobbled Koppenberg, the steepest climb of the race. The Koppenberg was immediately followed by the flat cobbled sector of the Mariaborrestraat, leading to the Steenbeekdries and Taaienberg climbs. The second pairing of Oude Kwaremont and Paterberg represented the end game of the race, preceding the  run-in to the finish.

Categorised climbs and cobbles

Eighteen categorised climbs are programmed, of which 12 are cobbled. In addition to the climbs, five sectors of flat cobbled roads are included.

Participating teams
25 teams competed in the race. The 18 UCI WorldTeams were automatically invited and obliged to participate in the race, while an additional seven Professional Continental teams were given wildcard entries, when these were announced on 28 February 2017. Jens Keukeleire of  pulled out of the race on the morning of the start, making a total peloton of 199 riders.

Result

References

External links

2017 UCI World Tour
2017 in Belgian sport
2017
April 2017 sports events in Europe